Acentrella insignificans is a species of small minnow mayfly in the family Baetidae. It is found in Central America, North America. In North America its range includes southwestern, northern Canada, northern Mexico, the northern, southwestern United States, and Alaska.

References

Mayflies
Articles created by Qbugbot
Insects described in 1926